Gallegos may refer to:

People
 Gallegos, a common Spanish surname for "those from Galicia"

Places
Gallegos (Mieres), parish in Mieres, Asturias, Spain
Gallegos, Segovia, village and municipality in the province of Segovia, Spain
Gallegos de Solmirón, village and municipality in the province of Salamanca, Spain
Río Gallegos, city in Santa Cruz, Argentina
San Felices de los Gallegos, village and municipality in the province of Salamanca, Spain

Other
Gallegos River, in the province of Santa Cruz, Argentina
Rómulo Gallegos Prize, Venezuelan prize for literature

See also
 Gallego (disambiguation)